Tahanea Atoll is an atoll of the Tuamotu Archipelago in French Polynesia.

The southern reef fringing the atoll is wider than the northern one, but the largest islands are on the narrower northern rim. There are three deep, navigable, passes into the lagoon, which are called Motupuapua, Teavatapu and Otao.

Tahanea is uninhabited, but visited occasionally by islanders from neighboring atolls.

History
The first recorded European to sight Tahanea was Spanish navigator Domingo de Boenechea on 9 November 1774 on ship Aguila. He named this atoll "San Julián".

Russian oceanic explorer Fabian Gottlieb von Bellingshausen visited Tahanea in 1820 on ships Vostok and Mirni. He named this atoll "Chichagov" .

Administration
Tahanea belongs to the commune of Anaa that also includes the associated commune of Faaite with the atoll of Faaite and the uninhabited atolls of Tahanea and Motutunga.

See also

 Desert island
 List of islands

References

External links

Oceandots
Spanish voyages
Bellingshausen
Atoll list (in French)

Atolls of the Tuamotus
Uninhabited islands of French Polynesia